Gerhard Hecht (March 16, 1923 – February 21, 2005) was a German boxer. Hecht fought for the middleweight championship against Sugar Ray Robinson in 1951. The fight ended when Robinson hit Hecht in the kidney, and Hecht could not continue. The fight was originally ruled a disqualification victory for Hecht, but later changed to a no-contest.

Professional boxing record

|-
|align="center" colspan=8|53 Wins (23 knockouts, 30 decisions), 13 Losses (9 knockouts, 4 decisions), 6 Draws, 2 No Contests
|-
| align="center" style="border-style: none none solid solid; background: #e3e3e3"|Result
| align="center" style="border-style: none none solid solid; background: #e3e3e3"|Record
| align="center" style="border-style: none none solid solid; background: #e3e3e3"|Opponent
| align="center" style="border-style: none none solid solid; background: #e3e3e3"|Type
| align="center" style="border-style: none none solid solid; background: #e3e3e3"|Round
| align="center" style="border-style: none none solid solid; background: #e3e3e3"|Date
| align="center" style="border-style: none none solid solid; background: #e3e3e3"|Location
| align="center" style="border-style: none none solid solid; background: #e3e3e3"|Notes
|-align=center
|Loss
|
|align=left| Albert Westphal
|TKO
|6
|21/11/1958
|align=left| Ernst Merck Halle, Hamburg
|align=left|
|-
|Loss
|
|align=left| Alain Cherville
|KO
|4
|08/03/1958
|align=left| Killesbergpark, Stuttgart, Baden-Württemberg
|align=left|
|-
|Loss
|
|align=left| Willi Hoepner
|PTS
|12
|20/09/1957
|align=left| Ernst Merck Halle, Hamburg
|align=left|
|-
|Loss
|
|align=left| Artenio Calzavara
|PTS
|15
|12/07/1957
|align=left| Milan, Lombardy
|align=left|
|-
|Win
|
|align=left| Willy Schagen
|PTS
|10
|03/05/1957
|align=left| Ostseehalle, Kiel, Schleswig-Holstein
|align=left|
|-
|Win
|
|align=left| Alex Buxton
|PTS
|10
|26/04/1957
|align=left| Sportpalast, Schoeneberg, Berlin
|align=left|
|-
|Loss
|
|align=left| Yolande Pompey
|KO
|2
|25/01/1957
|align=left| Sportpalast, Schoeneberg, Berlin
|align=left|
|-
|Loss
|
|align=left| Heinz Neuhaus
|PTS
|12
|17/11/1956
|align=left| Westfalenhallen, Dortmund, North Rhine-Westphalia
|align=left|
|-
|Loss
|
|align=left| Peter Bates
|KO
|5
|04/05/1956
|align=left| Sportpalast, Schoeneberg, Berlin
|align=left|
|-
|Win
|
|align=left| Charles Colin
|RTD
|13
|26/02/1956
|align=left| Saint Nazaire Stadium, Saint-Nazaire, Loire-Atlantique
|align=left|
|-
|Win
|
|align=left| Heinz Neuhaus
|PTS
|12
|06/11/1955
|align=left| Westfalenhallen, Dortmund, North Rhine-Westphalia
|align=left|
|-
|Win
|
|align=left| Henry Hall
|PTS
|10
|16/09/1955
|align=left| Ernst Merck Halle, Hamburg
|align=left|
|-
|Win
|
|align=left| Willi Hoepner
|KO
|13
|12/06/1955
|align=left| Westfalenhallen, Dortmund, North Rhine-Westphalia
|align=left|
|-
|Loss
|
|align=left| Willi Hoepner
|TKO
|3
|11/03/1955
|align=left| Ernst Merck Halle, Hamburg
|align=left|
|-
|Win
|
|align=left| Yvon Durelle
|UD
|10
|12/11/1954
|align=left| Sportpalast, Schoeneberg, Berlin
|align=left|
|-
|Win
|
|align=left| Wim Snoek
|PTS
|15
|23/09/1954
|align=left| Ernst Merck Halle, Hamburg
|align=left|
|-
|Win
|
|align=left| Art Henri
|PTS
|8
|27/08/1954
|align=left| Sportpalast, Schoeneberg, Berlin
|align=left|
|-
|Win
|
|align=left| Jacques Hairabedian
|PTS
|15
|09/04/1954
|align=left| Ernst Merck Halle, Hamburg
|align=left|
|-
|Win
|
|align=left| Guenter Balzer
|PTS
|8
|12/03/1954
|align=left| Stadthalle, Hannover, Lower Saxony
|align=left|
|-
|Loss
|
|align=left| Johnny Williams
|KO
|2
|22/01/1954
|align=left| Sportpalast, Schoeneberg, Berlin
|align=left|
|-
|Draw
|
|align=left| Karel Sys
|PTS
|10
|02/10/1953
|align=left| Sportpalast, Schoeneberg, Berlin
|align=left|
|-
|Win
|
|align=left| Johnny Barton
|PTS
|10
|07/08/1953
|align=left| Ernst Merck Halle, Hamburg
|align=left|
|-
|Win
|
|align=left| Fernando Jannilli
|PTS
|8
|05/07/1953
|align=left| Waldbühne, Westend, Berlin
|align=left|
|-
|Win
|
|align=left| Hans Stretz
|KO
|10
|16/05/1953
|align=left| Sportpalast, Schoeneberg, Berlin
|align=left|
|-
|Win
|
|align=left| Albert Finch
|TKO
|9
|20/03/1953
|align=left| Funkturm Berlin, Westend, Berlin
|align=left|
|-
|Win
|
|align=left| Gino Menozzi
|KO
|3
|23/01/1953
|align=left| Zeltarena, Hamburg
|align=left|
|-
|Win
|
|align=left| Renato Tontini
|KO
|6
|16/01/1953
|align=left| Funkturm Berlin, Westend, Berlin
|align=left|
|-
|Win
|
|align=left| Willi Hoepner
|PTS
|12
|21/11/1952
|align=left| Funkturm Berlin, Westend, Berlin
|align=left|
|-
|Win
|
|align=left| Stephane Olek
|PTS
|8
|07/09/1952
|align=left| Waldbühne, Westend, Berlin
|align=left|
|-
|Win
|
|align=left| Paul Schirrmann
|PTS
|8
|26/07/1952
|align=left| Sportpalast, Schoeneberg, Berlin
|align=left|
|-
|Win
|
|align=left| Emile DeGreef
|PTS
|10
|04/07/1952
|align=left| Sportpalast, Schoeneberg, Berlin
|align=left|
|-
|Win
|
|align=left| Herbert Kleinwachter
|PTS
|10
|11/05/1952
|align=left| Waldbühne, Westend, Berlin
|align=left|
|-
|Win
|
|align=left| Victor d'Haes
|PTS
|10
|04/04/1952
|align=left| Ernst Merck Halle, Hamburg
|align=left|
|-
|Win
|
|align=left| Hans Strelecki
|PTS
|8
|09/03/1952
|align=left| Westfalenhallen, Dortmund, North Rhine-Westphalia
|align=left|
|-
|Win
|
|align=left| Giuliano Pancani
|PTS
|8
|23/02/1952
|align=left| Funkturm Berlin, Westend, Berlin
|align=left|
|-
|Loss
|
|align=left| Willi Hoepner
|PTS
|12
|02/11/1951
|align=left| Ernst Merck Halle, Hamburg
|align=left|
|-
|Win
|
|align=left| Rik Van Kuyck
|KO
|1
|10/09/1951
|align=left| Ernst Merck Halle, Hamburg
|align=left|
|-
|No Contest
|
|align=left| Sugar Ray Robinson
|NC
|2
|24/06/1951
|align=left| Waldbühne, Westend, Berlin
|align=left|
|-
|Win
|
|align=left| Albert Yvel
|TKO
|4
|29/04/1951
|align=left| Waldbühne, Westend, Berlin
|align=left|
|-
|Win
|
|align=left| Sammy Wilde
|PTS
|6
|16/03/1951
|align=left| Funkturm Berlin, Westend, Berlin
|align=left|
|-
|Win
|
|align=left| Eli Elandon
|PTS
|8
|24/02/1951
|align=left| Funkturm Berlin, Westend, Berlin
|align=left|
|-
|Win
|
|align=left| Herbert Kleinwachter
|KO
|6
|09/02/1951
|align=left| Ernst Merck Halle, Hamburg
|align=left|
|-
|Win
|
|align=left| Don Lee
|PTS
|8
|19/01/1951
|align=left| Messehalle 6 Messegelaende, Westend, Berlin
|align=left|
|-
|No Contest
|
|align=left| Jean Serres
|NC
|6
|09/12/1950
|align=left| Funkturm Berlin, Westend, Berlin
|align=left|
|-
|Win
|
|align=left| Rene Hauenstein
|TKO
|2
|08/10/1950
|align=left| Waldbühne, Westend, Berlin
|align=left|
|-
|Win
|
|align=left| Marcel Begeot
|TKO
|6
|20/08/1950
|align=left| Waldbühne, Westend, Berlin
|align=left|

|-
|Draw
|
|align=left| Herbert Kleinwachter
|PTS
|12
|14/05/1950
|align=left| Waldbühne, Westend, Berlin
|align=left|
|-
|Draw
|
|align=left| Hans Stretz
|PTS
|12
|01/04/1950
|align=left| Funkturm Berlin, Westend, Berlin
|align=left|
|-
|Win
|
|align=left| Willi Fanzlau
|PTS
|6
|25/02/1950
|align=left| Funkturm Berlin, Westend, Berlin
|align=left|
|-
|Draw
|
|align=left| Heinz Sanger
|PTS
|6
|04/02/1950
|align=left| Funkturm Berlin, Westend, Berlin
|align=left|
|-
|Win
|
|align=left| Hans Kupsch
|PTS
|6
|19/11/1949
|align=left| Funkturm Berlin, Westend, Berlin
|align=left|
|-
|Win
|
|align=left| Hermann Vermeulen
|PTS
|6
|17/09/1949
|align=left| Waldbühne, Westend, Berlin
|align=left|
|-
|Win
|
|align=left| Willy Schier
|PTS
|8
|03/09/1949
|align=left| Mungersdorfer Stadion, Cologne, North Rhine-Westphalia
|align=left|
|-
|Draw
|
|align=left| Hans Baumann
|PTS
|6
|14/08/1949
|align=left| Waldbühne, Westend, Berlin
|align=left|
|-
|Win
|
|align=left| Carl Schmidt
|KO
|3
|05/08/1949
|align=left| Planten un Blomen, Hamburg
|align=left|
|-
|Draw
|
|align=left| Carl Schmidt
|PTS
|8
|03/07/1949
|align=left| Waldbühne, Westend, Berlin
|align=left|
|-
|Win
|
|align=left| Heinz Titze
|KO
|4
|08/05/1949
|align=left| Waldbühne, Westend, Berlin
|align=left|
|-
|Win
|
|align=left| Hans Motzelt
|PTS
|8
|29/04/1949
|align=left| Zelt des Zirkus Blumenfeld, Berlin
|align=left|
|-
|Win
|
|align=left| Richard Zabel
|KO
|2
|09/04/1949
|align=left| Funkturm Berlin, Westend, Berlin
|align=left|
|-
|Win
|
|align=left| Siegfried Kleimenhagen
|TKO
|5
|05/03/1949
|align=left| Ausstellungshalle, Berlin
|align=left|
|-
|Win
|
|align=left| Rudolf Oremek
|PTS
|6
|19/02/1949
|align=left| Ausstellungshalle, Berlin
|align=left|
|-
|Win
|
|align=left| Erich Puhlmann
|KO
|2
|05/02/1949
|align=left| Austellungshalle, Berlin
|align=left|
|-
|Loss
|
|align=left| Hans Stretz
|KO
|2
|26/12/1948
|align=left| Messehalle, Leipzig, Saxony
|align=left|
|-
|Win
|
|align=left| Erich Campe
|PTS
|6
|17/10/1948
|align=left| Waldbühne, Westend, Berlin
|align=left|
|-
|Win
|
|align=left| Heinz Rohde
|KO
|2
|02/10/1948
|align=left| Waldstadion Friedrichshafen, Berlin
|align=left|
|-
|Win
|
|align=left| Werner Dietrich
|KO
|1
|01/09/1948
|align=left| Messehalle, Leipzig, Saxony
|align=left|
|-
|Win
|
|align=left| Franz Schmidt
|KO
|6
|01/08/1948
|align=left| Waldbühne, Westend, Berlin
|align=left|
|-
|Loss
|
|align=left| Guenter Balzer
|KO
|1
|20/06/1948
|align=left| Olympiastadium, Westend, Berlin
|align=left|
|-
|Win
|
|align=left| Willi Domagala
|KO
|2
|13/06/1948
|align=left| Messehalle, Leipzig, Saxony
|align=left|
|-
|Loss
|
|align=left| Rudolf Oremek
|KO
|2
|08/05/1948
|align=left| Eisstadion, Cologne, North Rhine-Westphalia
|align=left|
|-
|Win
|
|align=left| Karl Hohne
|KO
|2
|14/03/1948
|align=left| Friedrichstadt Palast, Mitte, Berlin
|align=left|
|-
|Win
|
|align=left| Willi Franke
|KO
|1
|28/12/1947
|align=left| Thueringenhalle, Erfurt, Thuringia
|align=left|
|-
|Win
|
|align=left| Horst Raspe
|TKO
|4
|14/12/1947
|align=left| Gesellschaftshaus, Sonneberg, Thuringia
|align=left|
|-
|Win
|
|align=left| Harry Kohler
|PTS
|4
|12/09/1947
|align=left| Reichshallen Garten, Erfurt, Thuringia
|align=left|
|}

References

German male boxers
1923 births
2005 deaths
Boxers from Berlin
Middleweight boxers